Genaille–Lucas rulers (also known as Genaille's rods) are an arithmetic tool invented by Henri Genaille, a French railway engineer, in 1891.  The device is a variant of Napier's bones.  By representing the carry graphically, the user can read off the results of simple multiplication problems directly, with no intermediate mental calculations.

History
In 1885, French mathematician Édouard Lucas posed an arithmetic problem during a session of the Académie française. Genaille, already known for having invented a number of arithmetic tools, created his rulers in the course of solving the problem.  He presented his invention to the Académie française in 1891.  The popularity of Genaille's rods was widespread but short-lived, as mechanical calculators soon began to displace manual arithmetic methods.

Appearance
A full set of Genaille–Lucas rulers consists of eleven strips of wood or metal.  On each strip is printed a column of triangles and a column of numbers:

Multiplication
By arranging these rulers in the proper order, the user can solve multiplication problems.

Consider multiplying 52749 by 4.  Five rulers, one for each digit of 52749, are arranged side-by-side, next to the "index" ruler:

The second multiplicand is 4, so we look at the fourth row:

We start from the top number in the last column of the selected row:

The grey triangle points the way to the next number:

We follow the triangles from right to left, until we reach the first column.

Then we simply read off the digits that we visited.  The product, shown in red, is 210996.

Division
Soon after their development by Genaille, the rulers were adapted to a set of rods that can perform division. The division rods are aligned similarly to the multiplication rods, with the index rod on the left denoting the divisor, and the following rods spelling out the digits of the dividend. After these, a special "remainder" rod is placed on the right. The quotient is read from left to right, following the lines from one rod to the next. The path of digits ends with a number on the remainder rod, which is the remainder given by the division.

Resources

See also
 Napier's bones
 Slide rule

References

External links
 History of computers and computing: Napier's bones.  Describes the use of Genaille–Lucas rulers.

Mechanical calculators
Multiplication